Taniela Rawaqa (born April 30, 1986) is a Fijan rugby union player. He plays fullback, presently with the Western Crusaders in the Colonial Cup and with the Fiji Warriors in the Pacific Rugby Cup and internationally with Fiji. He is the younger brother of Fijian International Ifereimi Rawaqa
 
He made his international debut against Samoa in the 2007 Pacific Nations Cup and was regarded and one of the greatest prospects and successor of Nicky Little. He also played for Fiji Sevens. He plays for Fiji A in the Punjas Rugby Series.

Rawaqa is currently the second highest points scorer in Pacific Nations Cup history with 103 points.

Rawaqa turned out for Jaffna Challengers in the Sri Lanka's Carlton Sevens Tournament in 2012.

He currently turns out for Navy Sports Club in the Sri Lankan Premier Rugby League whose team is captained
by Yoshitha Rajapakse the Sri Lankan Rugby Captain and son of the Sri Lankan President.

External links

 
 Taniela Rawaqa at Fiji Rugby Union
 
 

1986 births
Living people
Fijian rugby union players
Rugby union fullbacks
Fiji international rugby union players
SU Agen Lot-et-Garonne players
Fijian expatriate rugby union players
Expatriate rugby union players in France
Fijian expatriate sportspeople in France
Expatriate rugby union players in Romania
Fijian expatriate sportspeople in Romania
Fiji international rugby sevens players
Sportspeople from Lautoka
I-Taukei Fijian people
CSM Știința Baia Mare players